McDonald Run is a  long tributary to Slippery Rock Creek that rises near Forestville in Butler County, Pennsylvania and flows south to meet Slippery Rock Creek near Branchton.

See also 
 List of rivers of Pennsylvania

References

Rivers of Pennsylvania
Tributaries of the Beaver River
Rivers of Butler County, Pennsylvania